The 1994 United States Senate special election in Oklahoma was held November 8, 1994. Incumbent Democratic U.S. Senator David Boren decided to resign his position to accept the position as president of the University of Oklahoma, which prompted a special election. Republican Jim Inhofe won the open seat.

Major candidates

Democratic 
 Dave McCurdy, U.S. Representative

Republican 
 Jim Inhofe, U.S. Representative

Results

See also 
 1994 United States Senate elections

References 

1994 Oklahoma elections
Oklahoma (special)
Oklahoma 1994
1994
United States Senate 1994
Oklahoma Senate 1994